Dana Ervin Kiecker (born February 25, 1961) is a former starting pitcher in Major League Baseball who played for the Boston Red Sox during 1990-1991. He batted and threw right-handed.

Early years

Kiecker was born in Sleepy Eye, Minnesota.  He attended Fairfax High School from 1976-1979.  Kiecker earned four varsity baseball letters during high school.  He earned three letters in basketball and two letters in football.  Kiecker set the single and career season record for receptions at wide receiver with 36 his senior year.  He earned WCCO Radio Prep Parade All-State and KNUJ All-Area accolades as a wide receiver his senior season.  Kiecker attended the American Legion Boys' State in 1978 and was selected as the Outstanding Boy's Stater from Minnesota and earned a trip to Boy's Nation in Washington, DC.  In 1979, Kiecker was a semi-finalist at the Mr. Minnesota Teen Program.  He spent the summer of 1979 working as an intern for Minnesota Governor Al Quie.  That summer, Kiecker played on the St Paul Public Safety American Legion baseball team coached by Jake Mauer, Sr. and Jake Mauer, Jr. grandfather and father to MLB catcher Joe Mauer.

College career

Kiecker played college baseball for the St. Cloud State University Huskies and was a freshman on the 1980 Northern Intercolligate Conference championship team which was a rarity among NCAA Division II teams in that it featured two other future Major Leaguers, Jim Eisenreich and Bob Hegman. He earned 4 varsity letters in baseball during his college career.  He was named the North Central Conference "Pitcher of the Year" during his senior year at SCSU.  He was drafted in the eighth round of the 1983 Major League Baseball draft.

Professional career

Boston Red Sox Minor League System 1983-1989

1983 - Led Elmira Suns staff in wins, ERA, CG, and Strikeouts.  Led the New York Penn League (NYP) with 111.2 IP. 
 
1985 - Led the Winter Haven Red Sox in GS with 29, IP, 193.2 and T2nd in CG with 9 in the Florida State League (FSL).
     
1986 - Tied for 1st on staff in GS, 24 and 2nd in IP, 156.1 at New Britain of the Eastern League.

1987 - Third on New Britain team in G, 39 and IP, 153.  Overall finished 7-10, 3.82 ERA and 6 saves.
 
1988 - Third on Pawtucket Red Sox staff in IP, 132.1 and T3rd in GS, 22. Named International League Player of the Week June 19-25.
  
1989 - Finished 8-9, 3.67 ERA with 3 CG.  T2nd on Pawtucket staff in SO with 87.

Boston Red Sox 1990-1992

Was a 6-year renewal minor league free agent until signed by Red Sox in December of 1989 and placed on 40-man roster for the first time. 

In 1990, Dana made the Red Sox opening day roster out of spring training.  Started the season as a middle reliever before moving into the starting rotation in early May and making 25 starts.  At the time it was the most GS for a Red Sox rookie since Mike Nagy had 28 in 1969.  In his 5 road wins he allowed 3 R (1 ER) total and did not allow a run in his last 3 road wins.  First Major League win came at Fenway Park on June 9 vs. Cleveland, 11-6.  Had a career high 9 k and 0 BB in 6+ IP on June 14 in Yankee Stadium but lost 3-1.  Pitched into the 6th inning in 19 of 25 starts.  On 0-2 counts held opponents to a .118 average (6-51) with 27 K.  Only gave up 7 HR in 157.2 IP in 1990.  Finished the regular season 8-9, 3.97 ERA, 152 IP, 145 H, 54 BB and 93 K.  Member of the 1990 American League East Champion Boston Red Sox.  In the 1990 American League Championship Series versus the Oakland Athletics, started and had a no decision in Game 2 at Fenway Park (5.2 IP, 6 H, 1 R).  Left with the score tied 1-1 but the Red Sox lost 4-1.  Named Red Sox Rookie of the Year by the Boston Baseball Writer's Association. 

Started the 1991 season working out of the bullpen.  Made 6 relief appearances before moving into the rotation for 4 starts in May.  Placed on the disabled list on May 30 with a sore right elbow.  Spent the majority of June-August rehabilitating in Pawtucket of the International League.  Recalled to Boston on September 8.  Finished the season 2-3, 7.36 ERA in 18 games.  In November he had arthroscopic surgery on his right elbow.   

In 1992, Kiecker was released by the Boston Red Sox at the end of spring training.  He signed a minor league deal with Cleveland in 1992, but had a 2nd arthroscopic surgery in November.  Attended minor league spring training with the Minnesota Twins in 1993, before retiring due to continued elbow soreness.  

In a two-season career, Kiecker posted a 10-12 record with 114 strikeouts and a 4.68 ERA in 192.1 innings pitched.

Post-baseball life 

After retiring from professional baseball in 1993, Kiecker continued to play amateur baseball. In 1993, he turned down a contract offer from the independent St. Paul Saints. He would, however, go on to become a long-serving television analyst for the club.

Kiecker began driving a truck for United Parcel Service in 1988 during his offseasons with the Pawtucket Red Sox. , he had risen to Enterprise Accounts Manager. He became a pitching coach at Dakota County Technical College in 2017 and retired from UPS in 2018 after 27 years of service.

, he lived in Eagan, Minnesota. , he lived in Eagan with his wife, Julie.

References

External links
Baseball Reference

1961 births
Living people
Baseball announcers
Baseball players from Minnesota
Boston Red Sox players
Elmira Pioneers players
Junior college baseball coaches in the United States
Major League Baseball pitchers
New Britain Red Sox players
Pawtucket Red Sox players
People from Sleepy Eye, Minnesota
St. Cloud State Huskies baseball players
Winston-Salem Spirits players